Sérgio Fernando Paranhos Fleury (19 May 1933 – 1 May 1979) was a Brazilian police deputy during the Brazilian military dictatorship. He was chief of DOPS, the Brazilian "", that had a major role during the years of the Brazilian military government. Fleury was known for his violent temper and was officially accused of torture and homicide of numerous people, but died before being tried.

Activities 
He became known for his participation in torture and extrajudicial killings during the military regime.
Several prisoner reports and witness testimonies indicate that he consistently used torture during interrogations during the time of the military regime.

Fleury himself was directly involved in the torture of Tito de Alencar Lima, known as Friar Tito, a catholic friar who fought against the military regime in Brazil.

Besides using torture, Fleury was investigated and denounced by Prosecutors Hélio Bicudo and Dirceu de Mello for murders committed by the Death Squadron. The Public Prosecutor of São Paulo found him to be the main leader of the Death Squadron which was responsible for innumerable extrajudicial killings in Brazil. Although convicted, he did not serve time.

His biography by Brazilian journalist Percival de Souza, titled "Autópsia do Medo", details his involvement with torture and several extrajudicial killings.
He was chosen as the deputy of the year two times, in 1974 and 1976, and received an award from the governor Abreu Sodré in 1969.

He was responsible for the killing of guerrilla leader Carlos Marighella in 1969, and for the attack against members of the Communist Party of Brazil in 1976.

Death and legacy
According to his wife, he drowned while out on his boat on May 1, 1979.

A street in the city of São Carlos was named after him until 2009, when protests resulted in legislation that changed the name of the street to Frei Tito.

See also 
National Truth Commission
DOI-CODI
Operation Condor

References 

1933 births
1979 deaths
People from Niterói
Brazilian police officers
Politicide perpetrators
People who died at sea